In Major League Baseball (MLB), the wild card teams are the three teams in each of the two leagues (American and National) that have qualified for the postseason despite failing to win their division. Those teams in each league possess the three best winning percentages in their league after the three division winners. The wild card was first instituted in MLB in 1994, with one wild card team per league advancing to the Division Series in the postseason to face a division winner. 

In 2012, the system was modified to add a second wild card team per league and pit each league's wild card teams against each other in a play-in game – the MLB Wild Card Game – the winner of which would then advance to the Division Series and play the team with the best record. The two teams with the best records outside of the division champions advanced to the wild card game. The two wild card teams could come out of the same division so there was no guarantee a team that came in second place in their division would make the playoffs.

One wild card per league (1994–2011)
From 1969 through 1993, the division leaders in each league advanced to the League Championship Series, with the winners of each LCS meeting in the World Series. However, an expanding number of teams in MLB over the years made making the playoffs increasingly difficult. The new system was instituted in 1994 (but first used in 1995 because a players strike canceled the 1994 playoffs) when Major League Baseball expanded from two to three divisions per league. In the new three-division leagues, each league had four teams in the playoffs; in addition to the three division winners, the division runner-up with the best record received a wild card spot. This assured that the team with the second-best record in its league would qualify for the postseason even if it wasn’t a division champion.

Thus, a third postseason round was added, the Division Series. From 1995 to 1997, a yearly rotation was used to decide the match-ups in the Division Series, although the wild card team was prevented from playing its own division's champion. Beginning in 1998, the team with the best record in the league would typically face the wild card team and the other two division winners would play each other, with second-best division winner having home-field. However, if the division winner with the league's best record and the wild card team came from the same division, the wild card would face the second-best division winner in the league.

Historic anomalies
A "wild card" rule was used in the 1981 season after a players' strike wiped out the "middle third" of the season. The owners decided that the winners (in each division) of each "half" of the abbreviated season would make the playoffs, with the caveat that if the same team won both halves then that division's team with the second-best record from the second half would enter the playoffs as a wild card. However, the wild card rule was not actually used since all four divisions had different first half and second-half winners.  As a result of the hastily contrived format, the Cincinnati Reds finished the regular season with the best record in all of baseball (66-42 .611) but failed to qualify for the playoffs because they finished 0.5 game behind the Dodgers in the first half and 1.5 games behind the Astros in the second half.  The Astros finished 8 games back in the first half and the Dodgers 6 back in the second.

For the 2020 postseason only, because of the COVID-19 pandemic, the playoff field expanded to include the second-place teams in each division, followed by the wild card teams represented by the next two best records from each league. All eight teams played in a best-of-three Wild Card Series.

Two wild cards per league (2012–2019, 2021)

On November 17, 2011, MLB announced that it would be adding two wild card teams to the postseason.

The two wild card teams in each league faced each other in a one-game playoff. The winner of this game advanced to meet the top seed in the Division Series. The revised playoff system began with the 2012 season. As mentioned previously, this system was not used during the 2020 season because of the COVID-19 pandemic.

Three wild cards per league (2022–present)
Starting with the 2022 season, MLB added a third wild card team in each league. In the new Wild Card Series, the top two division winners in each league receive a bye to the Division Series, while the lowest-seeded division winner and three wild card teams will play in this round. A best-of-three series will take place, with the higher seed hosting all three games. Due to the expansion of the postseason beginning in 2022, the regular season tie-breaker game format has been eliminated. The winner of the 4 vs. 5 seeded matchup faces the top seeded division winner in the Division Series, while the winner of the 3 vs. 6 seeded matchup faces the second seeded division winner in the other Division Series as there is no reseeding in between rounds.

Wild card winners by year and by most wild card titles
For each league's list of wild card winners by year and teams with most wild card titles, see:
List of American League Wild Card winners
List of National League Wild Card winners

Notable wild card team achievements
The following wild card teams have won the World Series: the Florida Marlins, in 1997 and 2003; the Anaheim Angels, in 2002; the Boston Red Sox, in 2004; the St. Louis Cardinals, in 2011; the San Francisco Giants, in 2014; and the Washington Nationals, in 2019.
A wild card team appeared in the World Series each year from 2002 to 2007.
The 2002 World Series and 2014 World Series have been the only times when both teams were wild cards.
The Baltimore Orioles, in 1996, were the first wild card team to win a Division Series.
The Marlins, in 1997, were the first wild card team to reach and first to win the World Series. By winning again in 2003, they became the first team to win the World Series twice as a wild card. The Marlins are also the only team to win the World Series without ever winning a division title.
The Red Sox and New York Yankees have been a wild card seven times. The Colorado Rockies have been a wild card five times. The Oakland Athletics have been a wild card four times, while the St. Louis Cardinals, the Houston Astros, the Pittsburgh Pirates, the Orioles, the New York Mets, the Giants, the Chicago Cubs, and the Tampa Bay Rays have been a wild card three times each.
The Houston Astros were the first team to have won a wild card in different leagues. NL (2004-2005) and AL (2015)
The following teams have qualified as a wild card in consecutive years: the Red Sox (1998-1999, 2003-2005, 2008-2009), the Astros (2004-2005), the Mets (1999-2000), the Cardinals (2011-2012), the Pirates (2013-2015), the Yankees (2017−2018), the Rockies (2017−2018), the Athletics (2018−2019), and the Brewers (2019–2020).
All Major League teams have earned a wild card berth; the last team never to have been a wild card was the Philadelphia Phillies, who earned a berth in 2022.

See also

Wild card (sports)#Major League Baseball
Major League Baseball division winners

Footnotes

Major League Baseball postseason
1995 introductions